Cortney Jordan (born June 24, 1991 in Las Vegas, Nevada) is an American swimmer.

Swimming career
Jordan broke onto the international swimming scene when she won bronze in the 50, 100, and 400 metre freestyles at 2006 World Championships. In 2009, she competed at 2009 Short course World Championships for 50, 100, and 400 freestyles and won silver for all of them. Next year, she was awarded with two gold medals for 4x100 individual medley and freestyle at 2010 World Championships. She also competed at ParaPan Pacific Games in 2011, where she won 3 silver medals for 50, 100, and 200 metre freestyles and an individual medley. The same year, she was awarded with two bronze medals in 400 metre freestyle and 100 metre backstroke. 2012 Summer Paralympics brought her 3 silver ones for 50, 100, and 400 metre freestyle and a bronze one for 100 metre backstroke. She has been swimming since she was seven years old.

References

External links 
 
 

1991 births
Living people
Sportspeople from the Las Vegas Valley
Paralympic swimmers of the United States
Swimmers at the 2012 Summer Paralympics
Swimmers at the 2008 Summer Paralympics
Paralympic bronze medalists for the United States
Paralympic silver medalists for the United States
Paralympic gold medalists for the United States
American female freestyle swimmers
American disabled sportspeople
Medalists at the 2008 Summer Paralympics
Medalists at the 2012 Summer Paralympics
S7-classified Paralympic swimmers
Medalists at the 2016 Summer Paralympics
Medalists at the World Para Swimming Championships
Paralympic medalists in swimming
21st-century American women
American female backstroke swimmers
American female medley swimmers
Medalists at the FINA World Swimming Championships (25 m)